The 2017 Sriwijaya season  is the 11th season in the club's football history, the 11th consecutive season in the top-flight Liga Indonesia season and the 7th season competing in the Liga 1.

Matches

Legend

Liga 1

Statistics

Squad & Appearances

Transfers

In

Out

Sources 

2017 in Indonesian football
Sriwijaya F.C.
Indonesian football clubs 2017 season